City of Subarus is the second album from the indie pop band Tullycraft. Chris Munford from the band Incredible Force of Junior joined Tullycraft prior to the recording of this album, making the three piece a foursome. On this sophomore release, Tullycraft introduced electronic beats and a punk-ish sound contrasting with their debut Old Traditions, New Standards. The entire record was self-recorded using an Otari MX5050 8-track analog tape machine at a house rented by Munford and drummer Jeff Fell. The house was located across the street from a Subaru dealership, inspiring the album's title. Jen Abercrombie from the Los Angeles band Rizzo provided additional vocals on many of the songs.

Track listing
"8 Great Ways"
"Belinda"
"Ticket Tonight"
"Crush This Town"
"Godspeed"
"Miss Douglas County"
"Actives & Pledges"
"The Lives of Cleopatra"
"Bee Sting Stings"
"Vacation in Christine, ND"

Personnel
 Sean Tollefson – vocals, bass
 Jeff Fell – drums, bass
 Gary Miklusek – lead guitar, keyboard 
 Chris Munford – keyboard, guitar, backing vocals | recording, audio engineering
 Jen Abercrombie – vocals, backing vocals

References 

 Strong, M. C. (2003). The Great Indie Discography (2nd Edition) pg. 1041. Published by Canon Books Ltd. (US/CAN) .

Tullycraft albums
1998 albums